Any Night is a 1922 American silent crime film directed by Martin Beck and starring Tully Marshall, Robert Edeson and Lila Leslie.

Cast
 Tully Marshall as 	Jerry Maguire 
 Robert Edeson as 	Jim Barton
 Lila Leslie as Mrs. Ann Barton
 Gordon Sackville as 	Reverend John Matthew
 William Courtleigh as 	Dr. LeRoy Clifford

References

Bibliography
 Connelly, Robert B. The Silents: Silent Feature Films, 1910-36, Volume 40, Issue 2. December Press, 1998.
 Munden, Kenneth White. The American Film Institute Catalog of Motion Pictures Produced in the United States, Part 1. University of California Press, 1997.

External links
 

1922 films
1922 crime films
American silent feature films
American crime films
American black-and-white films
1920s English-language films
1920s American films